Aviolanda was a Dutch aircraft manufacturer. The company was established in December 1926 by H. Adolph Burgerhout. Aviolanda mainly produced licensed-built aircraft, such as the Curtiss P-6 Hawk, the Dornier Wal and Do 24 flying boats, and the Gloster Meteor, Hawker Hunter and the Lockheed F-104 Starfighter jets. Aviolanda was the parent company of Dutch helicopter manufacturer NHI. It was eventually taken over by Fokker Aircraft in 1967 and was renamed Avio-Fokker.

Aviolanda had its main plant in Papendrecht.  The production facility in Papendrecht was later used by GKN Aerospace to produce fuselage sections of the NHIndustries NH90.

Aircraft produced
Aviolanda AT-21 target drone

References

Defunct aircraft manufacturers of the Netherlands
Defunct helicopter manufacturers
Papendrecht
Defence companies of the Netherlands